The Quail Avenue Bridge is located southeast of Carroll, Iowa, United States.  The  span carries traffic on Quail Avenue over an unnamed stream.  This bridge was one of 15 similar spans that Carroll County had built in 1913.  The county board of supervisors contracted with the Standard Bridge Company of Omaha to build the Warren pony truss structures that were designed by the Iowa State Highway Commission (ISHC).  They were supported by a timber substructure.  The bridges became the prototype of what would become the ISHC's standard design.  Standard Bridge was paid $29,174 to build all the bridges, which included the costs for this bridge at $1,247.  It was listed on the National Register of Historic Places in 1998.

References

Bridges completed in 1913
Bridges in Carroll County, Iowa
Truss bridges in Iowa
Road bridges on the National Register of Historic Places in Iowa
National Register of Historic Places in Carroll County, Iowa
Warren truss bridges in the United States